Don't Be a Dick is the debut studio album by American rock band Emily's Army, released on June 14, 2011, through Rise Records and Adeline Records. The album was produced by drummer Joey Armstrong's father, Billie Joe Armstrong, and long time Green Day engineer Chris Dugan.

Background
Emily's Army released two singles and the demo in 2009 and 2010 and by the time they had played their first shows they started writing for their first studio album. The band started recording over Christmas 2010 and finished in March 2011. This is the band's first release on Rise Records. This is the first album produced by Billie Joe Armstrong.

Track listing

Personnel
Credits adapted from liner notes.
Emily's Army
 Cole Becker – lead vocals,  rhythm guitar
 Max Becker –  lead vocals, bass
 Joey Armstrong – drums, percussion, backing vocals
 Travis Neumann  – lead guitar, backing vocals

Additional personnel
 Billie Joe Armstrong - production 
 Chris Dugan - production 
 Mikaela Cohen - artwork

References

2011 debut albums
SWMRS albums
Adeline Records albums
Rise Records albums